Birtle may refer to:
 Birtle, Greater Manchester, England
 Birtle Indian Residential School
 Birtle, Manitoba, Canada
 Birtle (electoral district)